Malakacherla is a village in Eluru district of the Indian state of Andhra Pradesh. It is administered under of Eluru revenue division.

Demographics 

 Census of India, Malakacherla has population of 486 of which 253 are males while 233 are females.  Average Sex Ratio is 921. Population of children with age 0-6 is 39 which makes up 8.02% of total population of village, Child sex ratio is 950. Literacy rate of the village was 74.05%.

References

Villages in Eluru district